The 1935 Mannin Moar (formally known as III Mannin Moar) was a Grand Prix that was held on 31 May 1935 at a street circuit in Douglas, Isle of Man. It was the thirteenth race of the 1935 Grand Prix season, but it did not count towards the championship. The race, contested over 50 laps of 4.035 mi, or 6.494 km, was won by Brian Lewis driving a Bugatti T59 after starting from pole position. He also won the two previous editions of the Mannin Moar.

Entries

 DNA = Did Not Arrive
 DNS = Did Not Start

Starting positions

Race report
At the start Martin fell back to third place behind Shuttleworth and Lewis. Mays at his turn had gone up to fourth place. Within ten laps three drivers had to retire - Rose-Richards because of a broken universal joint and later both Leitch and Hamilton crashed separately.

In the thirteenth lap Shuttleworth retired, leaving the podium positions open for three Bugattis - Lewis, Martin and Eccles. Mays later challenged Eccles until both ERA drivers (Mays and Cook) had to make an extra pit stop around lap thirty due to problems with their cars. However, when Eccles got transmission trouble Mays took over third position, having passed Fontés on lap forty.

But in the last lap the ERA broke down with transmission failure, so Mays retired and the last podium position - after Lewis and Martin - finally went to Fontés. This was Lewis' third Mannin Moar victory.

Race results

References

External links
 www.kolumbus.fi
 Racing Sports Cars
 Driver Database
 1933 Mannin-Beg Car Race
 1933 Douglas Street Circuit
 1935 Mannin Moar Trophy

Mannin Moar